P. D. Sambandam was a comic actor who has performed many supporting and minor roles in Tamil films.

Filmography

References 

Male actors in Tamil cinema
Year of birth missing (living people)
Place of birth missing (living people)
Living people